Ovsiyenko is a Ukrainian surname. It is shared by the following people:
Tatyana Ovsiyenko, Russian singer; see Russia in the Eurovision Song Contest
Vasyl Ovsienko (Ovsiyenko), member of the Ukrainian Helsinki Group
Volodymyr Ovsienko (Ovsiyenko) (b. 1978), Ukrainian association football player
Yevgeny Ovsiyenko (b. 1988), Russian association football player

See also
Antonov-Ovseenko

References

Notes

Sources
И. М. Ганжина (I. M. Ganzhina). "Словарь современных русских фамилий" (Dictionary of Modern Russian Last Names). Москва, 2001. 

Ukrainian-language surnames
